Rolando Cruz (born 5 July 1930) is a Brazilian water polo player. He competed in the men's tournament at the 1960 Summer Olympics.

References

1930 births
Living people
Brazilian male water polo players
Olympic water polo players of Brazil
Water polo players at the 1960 Summer Olympics